Eero Johannes "Erkka" Tapio (3 March 1941 – 17 December 2022) was a Greco-Roman wrestler from Finland who won four medals at the world championships of 1965–69, including a gold medal in 1967. He competed at the 1964, 1968 and 1972 Summer Olympics and placed fifth-sixth in 1964 and 1968. He was voted the Finnish Sports Personality of the Year in 1967, placing within first ten in 1965, 1966 and 1969.

Tapio was born to a farmer, and through his life worked as a painter, janitor, wrestling coach, and sports official. From the 1970s–1980s, he worked with the national wrestling team. He had two children from his marriage, born in 1966 and 1968 respectively.

References

External links
 

1941 births
2022 deaths
Olympic wrestlers of Finland
Wrestlers at the 1964 Summer Olympics
Wrestlers at the 1968 Summer Olympics
Wrestlers at the 1972 Summer Olympics
Finnish male sport wrestlers
World Wrestling Championships medalists
Finnish wrestling coaches
European Wrestling Championships medalists
20th-century Finnish people
21st-century Finnish people
People from Muhos